is a Japanese vocalist, actor, and tarento represented by Iehokku. His maternal uncle is Naoki Prize writer Hideo Osabe. His wife is model Keiko Kinoshita.

Discography

Music provision

Filmography

Film

Drama

Other television

Radio series

Advertisements

References

External links
allcinema profile 

Japanese male singers
Japanese male actors
Japanese entertainers
1956 births
Living people
Musicians from Miyagi Prefecture
People from Shiogama, Miyagi